Zhitikara (Jıtıqara) is a town and the administrative center of Zhitikara District in Kostanay Region of northwestern Kazakhstan, close to the Kazakhstan–Russia border. The town is located in the west of the region, on the Turgay Plateau, west of the Tobol River. Population:

History
Zhitikara was founded in 1880 as the aul of Konildi. At the time, it was a part of Nikolayevsky Uyezd (later renamed Kustanaysky Uyezd) of Turgay Oblast. In 1915, it was renamed Zhitikara (Dzhetygara), and subsequently granted urban-type settlement status. In 1920, Turgay Oblast was transformed into Turgay Governorate, and on November 9, 1920, it was abolished and merged into Orenburg-Turgay Governorate. On April 1, 1921 the area was transferred into newly established Kustanay Governorate. Dzhetyhara was a part of Adamovsky District and the administrative center of Dzhetygarinskaya Volost. On August 15, 1922 the district was abolished and merged into Denisov District. On September 21, 1925 Kustanay Governorate was abolished and transformed into Kustanaysky Uytezd. On January 17, 1928 Kustanay Okrug of Aktobe Region was established, which included also Zhetigara District. In February 1932, okrugs were abolished, and the districts were directly subordinated to the oblast. Until 1936, the district administrative center of Zhitikara District was the settlement of Denisovka, and subsequently Dzhetygara was made the district center. On July 29, 1936, Kostanay Region was established as a part of Kazakh Soviet Socialist Republic, and Zhitikara District became a part of Kostanay Region.

In 1939, Dzetygara was granted the town status. In 1962, it was made a town of oblast significance. In 1997, the official spelling was changed to Zhitikara, and Zhitikara was made a town of district significance, the center of Zhitikara District.

Economy

Industry
The main industrial enterprise in Zhitikara is the Kostanay Minerals, mainly producing asbestos.

Transportation
Zhitikara is a terminal of the railway side line leading to the station of Tobol which is located on the railway between Kartaly and Astana.

The town is connected by roads with Kostanay via Rudny and with Kartaly.

See also
Rashid Nurgaliev, former Minister of Internal Affairs of Russia, born in this town.

References

Populated places in Kostanay Region